Crossing (also known as Keurosing) is a 2008 South Korean film directed by Kim Tae-kyun. It was selected as South Korea's submission to the 81st Academy Awards for Best Foreign Language Film. The film follows the journey of a North Korean man as he illegally leaves the country to find medicine for his sick wife, portraying the many hardships of the average North Korean citizen. The film had 907,255 admissions in South Korea.

The politics of North Korea in this film are left behind and are mainly in the background. Instead it concentrates more on the life of the average North Korean, such as the hardship in an impoverished state and the fear of getting caught and being persecuted in North Korea. Subtle themes include religion, which runs through the film, as Yong Soo hopes that his son comes back safely, as well as football which is a way in connecting the North Koreans to the outside world.

Plot
A North Korean father and husband decides to illegally cross into China to buy medicine for his pregnant wife, who is suffering from tuberculosis. Once he crosses into China, however, he realizes that it's not as easy as thought. He starts working as an illegal immigrant under the constant threat of capture by Chinese authorities and deportation back to North Korea. He eventually finds his way to South Korea by entering the German Embassy in China. Meanwhile, his wife dies, leaving their son homeless and wandering trying to find a way back to his father. Scenes switch between those of the father who is outside North Korea trying to find medicine, and those of the son, who ends up homeless and tries to defect also.

Cast
Cha In-pyo as Kim Yong-soo, the main protagonist and the father.
Sin Myeong-cheol as Kim Joon, the son of Kim Yong-soo.
Seo Young-hwa as Yong-soo's wife
Jung In-gi as Sang-cheol, friend of Yong-soo's who eventually gets sent to a labor camp, for smuggled goods.
Joo Da-young as Mi-seon, daughter of Sang-cheol, friend of Joon.
 Tae In-ho

Awards and nominations
2008 Buil Film Awards
 Nomination - Best New Actor - Sin Myeong-cheol

2008 Blue Dragon Film Awards
 Nomination - Best Film
 Nomination - Best Director - Kim Tae-kyun

2008 Korean Film Awards
 Nomination - Best Art Direction  - Kim Hyeon-ok
 Nomination - Best New Actor - Sin Myeong-cheol

Controversy
Shortly after the film was released it became embroiled in controversy as it has been accused of plagiarism by Lee Kwang Hoon. He argued that the film was written on a screenplay titled "The Conditions of Human" based on the story of North Korean defector Yoo Sang-joon which he wrote. Lee's lawyer also said that director Lee and Yoo had signed a contract to make a film about Yoo's life and has been preparing for the past three years. The lawyer claimed that a court injunction was sought because director Kim has not discussed the matter with director Lee, although Kim had known about the existence of a screenplay about Yoo. The request for an injunction applies to all theater presentations, as well as in the forms of DVD, video, and internet videos. Vantage Holdings, the distributor of Crossing has countered the accusation by saying that the director nor the film company has not violated Lee's copyright and added that they are looking into taking legal measures themselves.

The film has also been selected as South Korea's submission to the 81st Academy Awards for Best Foreign Language Film. But the Korean Film Council will select another submission if Crossing is found guilty when the issue comes to court. However, in the end the film was submitted to the 81st Academy Awards for Best Foreign Language Film, but was not nominated for the awards.

See also
Human rights in North Korea
North Korean defectors

References

External links
 
 
 
 Crossing at Vimeo

2008 films
Films directed by Kim Tae-kyun
2000s Korean-language films
Films involved in plagiarism controversies
South Korean drama films
South Korean political films
South Korean road movies
Films set in 2007
Films set in North Hamgyong Province
Films set in South Korea
Films set in China
Films set in Mongolia
Films shot in South Korea
Films shot in China
Films shot in Mongolia
Films about North Korean defectors
2000s South Korean films